Bake a Cake is a 2012 short film written and directed by Aliocha. It won the 'Aprile' award at the 2012 Milano Film Festival.

Plot
Six men gather to spend an evening together and tongues loosen.

Cast
 Jean-Louis Coulloc'h - Jean-Louis
 Sid Amiri - Sid
 Frode Bjornstad - Frode
 Jean-Pierre Dalaise - Jean-Pierre
 Benjamin Fanni - Benjamin
 Pablo Saavedra - Pablo

External links
 
 Bake a Cake on Facebook
 Bake a Cake at Unifrance.org

2012 films
French short films
2010s French-language films
Films directed by Aliocha
2010s French films